15 pounder can refer to several British and US weapon systems:

Ordnance BL 15 pounder
Ordnance BLC 15 pounder
Ordnance QF 15 pounder
3-inch gun M1903, also M1898 and M1902 seacoast guns